The 2015–16 Mississippi State Bulldogs basketball team represented Mississippi State University in the 2015–16 NCAA Division I men's basketball season. The Bulldogs, led by first year head coach Ben Howland, played their home games at the Humphrey Coliseum in Starkville, Mississippi as a member of the Southeastern Conference. They finished the season 14–17, 7–11 in SEC play to finish in 11th place. They lost to Georgia in the second round of the SEC tournament.

Previous season
The Bulldogs finished the 2014–15 season 13–19, 6–12 in SEC play to finish in a tie for 11th place. They lost in the first round of the SEC tournament to Auburn. On March 21, head coach Rick Ray was fired.  Shortly thereafter, Ben Howland was hired as head coach.

Before the season

Departures
The Bulldogs lost 4 scholarship players, two to graduation and two transfers. The team also had 2 senior walkons graduate.

Recruits

In addition, the Bulldogs added a transfer in Xavian Stapleton from Louisiana Tech. Stapleton will have to sit out the 2015–16 but will then have 3 years of eligibility.

Roster

Schedule and results

|-
!colspan=9 style="background:#660000; color:white;"| Exhibition

|-
!colspan=9 style="background:#660000; color:white;"| Non-conference regular season

|-
!colspan=9 style="background:#660000; color:white;"| SEC regular season

|-
!colspan=9 style="background:#660000; color:white;"| SEC tournament

See also
2015–16 Mississippi State Lady Bulldogs basketball team

References

Mississippi State Bulldogs men's basketball seasons
Mississippi State
Mississippi State Bulldogs basketball
Mississippi State Bulldogs basketball